The first cycle of Indonesia's Next Top Model aired weekly on Indonesian private broadcaster NET. starting November 28, 2020. Indonesian supermodel and actress Luna Maya and Deddy Corbuzier were added to the panel as the host and creative consultant of the show respectively, while Patricia Gouw and Panca Makmun were added to the panel as judge, catwalk coach, and main model mentor. Ayu Gani and Jesslyn Lim from Asia's Next Top Model were added as model mentors throughout the cycle. This season saw 16 contestants vying for a brand new Honda HR-V and cash amounting to hundreds of millions of Rupiahs.

The first cycle of the show was filmed under strict health protocols as it was produced during the COVID-19 pandemic, which also made the production team unable to take contestants to an international destination like the other Top Model editions around the world. However, the top five contestants took a trip to the coastal town of Anyer and stayed overnight as a local destination.

The winner of the competition was 23-year-old Danella Ilene Kurniawan, from Bali.

Cast

Contestants
(Ages stated are at start of contest)

Judges
 Luna Maya (host)
 Deddy Corbuzier
 Patricia Gouw
 Panca Makmun

Model mentors
 Ayu Gani
 Jesslyn Lim

Episodes

Results

Call-out order

 The contestant won the competition
 The contestant was immune from elimination
 The contestant returned to the competition
 The contestant was part of a non-elimination bottom two
 The contestant was eliminated
 The contestant was originally eliminated but was saved
 The contestant was absent at elimination and was safe

Bottom two

 The contestant was eliminated after their first time in the bottom two. 
 The contestant was eliminated after their second time in the bottom two. 
 The contestant was eliminated after their third time in the bottom two. 
 The contestant was eliminated after their fourth time in the bottom two. 
 The contestant was eliminated and placed as the runner-up/s.

Average  call-out order
Comeback episode and episode 40 are not included.

Photo / video shoot guide
Episode 2 photo shoot: Rock climbing couture
Episode 4 photo shoot: Fierce posing with Honda Civic Type R
Episode 6 commercial: Cruise ship party girls for Ellips Hair Vitamins on Jakarta Phinisi
Episode 8 photo shoot: Graffiti street style on rollerskates with Jerome Kurnia
Episode 10 photo shoot: Tough and elegant with Honda CR-V on fire runway
Episode 12 photo shoot: Wild jewelries with snakes in pairs
Episode 14 photo shoot: Underwater beauty in haute couture dress
Episode 16 photo shoot: Colour paint splashing
Episode 18 photo shoot: Self style and jumping on a trampoline with Honda Brio
Episode 20 commercial: Equestrian horse girl for Ellips Dry shampoo
Episode 22 photo shoot: Posing on a scaffold wearing tulle gowns
Episode 24 photo shoot: Ocean-themed headpieces for Queen of Fish market
Episode 26 photo shoot: Family road trip with Honda Mobilio RS
Episode 28 photo shoot: Aerial hoop editorial 
Episode 30 photo shoot: Girls in beauty salon with previously eliminated contestants
Episode 32 photo shoot: Espionage on a mission for Honda Civic Hatchback RS
Episode 34 photo shoot: Moody women in red gowns at Anyer reefs
Episode 36 photo shoot: Acroyoga black angels
Episode 38 commercial: Salsa torero in matador arena with Honda HR-V
Episode 40 photo shoot: Avant-garde designs at Kawah Putih crater lake

Makeovers
After the comeback episode, the remaining six finalists got a second makeover. Before the comeback episode, Ranti already got eliminated, and while outside the competition, she cut her hair boyish short style. Thus, she didn't have to get a second makeover.

Post-Top Model careers
 Audrey has signed with New Generation Model Management in Amsterdam. She has since modelled for Xiaomi Mi 11 smartphone's ad campaign, Nike Netherland and various Indonesian beauty brands, such as Trueve and MS Glow. She later went to Leiden for university and
 Clafita signed with Kick Management. She has also modelled for Trueve and MS Glow products.
 Devina signed with Kick Management. She is currently the host of crime-related programs (86 and Jatanras) on NET.
 Gea signed with Kick Management. She hosted an episode of the program Festival Film Pendek (Short Film Festival) on NET.
 Grace signed with Kick Management.
 Ilene signed with Castaway Model Management.

Controversy 
During a judging panel, Ilene (who later won the cycle) shared her battle with depression and eating disorder in response to Luna Maya's question about her photoshoot concept in Anyer beach. Deddy Corbuzier then cut off Ilene's story by saying "Depression? [...] You're pretty, you're a model. You're also tall, sexy, and smart. If you're depressed, you're insulting the martabak (stuffed pancake) vendor in front of my house.” Luna also said "I really like eating, so [do I have an] eating disorder?"

These remarks were met with backlash from the viewers and general public who believed their remarks were obtuse and insensitive to the issue of mental disorder. Videos of their remarks went viral on social media, in which many took to Twitter and Instagram to express their disapproval and also sympathy for Ilene, including psychiatrists and celebrities, also the former Asia's Next Top Model host Nadya Hutagalung. Felicia Hutapea, the daughter of lawyer Hotman Paris Hutapea also openly criticized Luna and Deddy in her instagram story, in which Luna responded through direct message that "everyone went through depression" and that [25-year-old Felicia] was "such a child". Luna and Deddy later apologized for their remarks through their instagram. Those remarks subsequently were edited out from the episode in the show's official YouTube channel in response to the backlash.

See also 
 Indonesia's Next Top Model
 Indonesia's Next Top Model (cycle 2)
 Indonesia's Next Top Model (cycle 3)

External links

References

Indonesia's Next Top Model
2020 Indonesian television seasons
2021 Indonesian television seasons
Television series impacted by the COVID-19 pandemic